Uranotaenia is a genus of mosquitoes containing at least 270 species. It is the only member of the tribe Uranotaeniini.

Subgenera
 Pseudoficalbia
 Uranotaenia

See also
 List of Uranotaenia species

References

 
Mosquito genera